Joachim Degener (28 November 1893 – 7 September 1953), was a German general in the Wehrmacht during World War II. A lifelong professional soldier, he served his country as a junior officer in World War I, a staff officer in the inter-war period and a brigade-level commander during World War II.

Works
 Greiner, Heinz, Joachim Degener: Aufgabenstellung und Übungsleitung mit praktischen Beispielen, Berlin: Mittler, 1938.
 Greiner, Heinz, Joachim Degener: Gefechtsführung und Kampftechnik, Berlin: Mittler, 1937.

References

1893 births
1953 deaths
Military personnel from Metz
People from Alsace-Lorraine
German Army personnel of World War I
Prussian Army personnel
Major generals of the German Army (Wehrmacht)
Reichswehr personnel
Recipients of the clasp to the Iron Cross, 1st class
German Army generals of World War II